Debra Jensen (born Debra Svensk on March 12, 1958, in Orange County, California) is an American model. She was Playboy magazine's Playmate of the Month for its January 1978 issue. Her centerfold was photographed by Phillip Dixon. Jensen was also on the cover of the March, 1978 issue of Playboy magazine. After her time as a Playboy model, she began modeling for Coppertone. More recently, Jensen has appeared on a couple of episodes of the reality TV series The Girls Next Door.

Personal
Jensen grew up in Southern California.  As a teenager she worked at a Baskin-Robbins Ice Cream shop. She was Kiss drummer Peter Criss's second wife. Criss started dating Jensen while still married to his first wife, Lydia. During her marriage to Peter Criss, she again used her birth name Debra Svensk. She has a daughter with Criss, Jennilee Criss.  she was married to Robert Mcmurry.

See also
 List of people in Playboy 1970–1979

References

External links
 

1958 births
Living people
1970s Playboy Playmates